Mohammed V International Airport  is an international airport serving Casablanca, Morocco. Located in Nouaceur Province, it is operated by ONDA.

With about 7.6 million passengers passing through the airport in 2022, it was the busiest airport in Morocco and in the top 10 of busiest airports in Africa. Passenger traffic in 2022 had recovered to 74% of the total pre-pandemic numbers of 2019. The airport serves as hub for Royal Air Maroc, Royal Air Maroc Express and Air Arabia Maroc. It is named after King Mohammed V of Morocco, who led the country's successful push for independence from French and Spanish colonial rule.

History

1940s
The Casablanca Mohammed V Airport was originally built by the United States in early 1943 following Operation Torch in World War II. It was named Berrechid Airfield and it served as an auxiliary airfield for Casablanca's Anfa Airport. The airfield handled diverse military traffic as a stopover en route to Port Lyautey Airfield, and to Marrakech Airport on the North African Cairo-Dakar route. In addition, it was the terminus of Mid-Atlantic route transatlantic flights via the Azores to Nova Scotia and airfields on the East Coast of the United States.

In addition to its transportation role, the airfield supported the North African Campaign with the Twelfth Air Force 68th Reconnaissance Group operating photo-reconnaissance versions of the P-38 Lightning and P-51 Mustang. Part of the 68th first arrived at Angads Airport in Oujda in November 1942 and moved to Berrechid in March 1943 upon its completion. It flew both antisubmarine missions over the Atlantic and photo-reconnaissance combat missions over German-held territory until early September when it moved east to Massicault Airfield in Tunisia. With the end of the war in 1945, the airfield was handed over to the civil government.

1950s
During the Cold War in the early and middle 1950s, the airfield was reopened as Nouasseur Air Base and was used as a United States Air Force Strategic Air Command staging area for B-47 Stratojet bombers pointed at the Soviet Union. These operations later moved to Ben Guerir Air Base.

With the destabilisation of French government in Morocco, and Moroccan independence in 1956, the government of Mohammed V wanted the US Air Force to pull its bases out of Morocco, insisting on such action after American intervention in Lebanon in 1958. The United States agreed to leave in December 1959, and was fully out of Morocco by 1963. The U.S. felt that, with the long range of the B-52 and completion of Spanish bases in 1959, the Moroccan bases were no longer important.

Airlines and destinations

Passenger
The following airlines operate regular scheduled and charter flights at Casablanca Mohammed V International Airport:

Cargo

Traffic

Ground transport

Rail 
The Al Bidaoui train service, operated by ONCF from 04:00 to 23:00, is available every hour and connects the airport to Casablanca's two main railway stations, Casa-Port Railway Terminal and Casa-Voyageurs Railway Station.

Car 
 From Casablanca main access is by A3 Motorway; 
 From Rabat by A1 Motorway through Tit Mellil and Road N9;
 From Beni Mellal by A4 Motorway;
 From Marrakech by A3 Motorway exit km 225;
 From El Jadida by A1 Motorway and A3 Motorway.

Incidents and accidents
 On 1 April 1970, a Royal Air Maroc Sud Aviation SE-210 Caravelle crashed on approach to Casablanca Mohammed V airport when it lost control at a height of about 500 feet. The fuselage broke in two. Sixty-one of the eighty-two passengers and crew were killed.

See also
Transport in Morocco

References

Notes

External links

 Mohammed V International Airport
 Moroccan Airports Authority
 
 
 

Airports in Morocco
Transport in Casablanca
World War II airfields in Morocco
Buildings and structures in Casablanca-Settat
1959 establishments in Morocco
Airports established in 1943
Airports established in 1959
1943 establishments in Morocco
20th-century architecture in Morocco